Claudio Alejandro Zolla Suárez (born 8 January 1969) is an affluent Peruvian businessman and politician. An advocate of classical liberalism, he is the founder and leader of the New Peru Liberal Party, a non-registered political party.

Biography 
He was born in the Jesús María District in Lima, Peru, on January 8, 1969.

He completed specialization studies in Theology at the Seminario Bíblico Camino de la Vida in San Borja and is currently the owner of the Nueva Lima lots.

Zolla entered politics at the 2010 municipal elections, running for the Lima City Council with National Restoration.

In 2015, Zolla attained press coverage as he confronted President Nicolás Maduro of Venezuela outside the United Nations headquarters in New York City. Engaging in a debate, Maduro mocked Zolla's views on capitalism and invited him over to Venezuela to "learn the truth". The debate ended shortly after as both men parted ways.

For the 2016 Peruvian general election, Zolla announced his candidacy for President of Peru, although he was not able to register his party in order to file his ticket. Subsequently, he signed a political accord with Peru Nation in order to run for First Vice President. With Francisco Diez Canseco Távara as the presidential nominee, the ticket was eventually withdrawn before the election, as the polling was extremely low for the party.

Currently, Zolla is running for Second Vice President with National United Renaissance (RUNA) for the 2021 Peruvian general election. His nomination was signed as part of a political accord with RUNA leader and presidential nominee, Ciro Gálvez.

References

External links
Official Site

1969 births
Living people
People from Lima
Christian clergy in Peru
Peruvian evangelicals
Peruvian politicians
Peruvian businesspeople